Fan Feifei (born 1 September 1989) is a Chinese retired goalball player. She won a silver medal at both the 2008 Summer Paralympics and the 2012 Summer Paralympics.

Fan had congenital cataract, a kind of visual impairment. She began playing goalball when she was 10 years old; just a year later she helped her province Shandong win a bronze medal at the National Para Games, at the age of 11. Donations poured in after her story was publicized, and she has since gained 20/200 vision through a cataract surgery in Shanghai.

Like her national teammates Lin Shan, Wang Ruixue, and Ju Zhen, Fan started playing the sport under coach Wang Jinqin at the Weifang School of the Blind in Weifang, Shandong.

References

Female goalball players
1989 births
Living people
Sportspeople from Shandong
People from Shouguang
Paralympic goalball players of China
Paralympic silver medalists for China
Goalball players at the 2008 Summer Paralympics
Goalball players at the 2012 Summer Paralympics
Medalists at the 2008 Summer Paralympics
Medalists at the 2012 Summer Paralympics
Paralympic medalists in goalball